The Nevis Amateur Athletic Association (NAAA) is the governing body for the sport of athletics in Nevis. The current president is Lester Blackett.

Affiliations 
Saint Kitts & Nevis Amateur Athletic Association (SKNAAA)
Leeward Islands Athletics Association (LIAA)

References

External links 
Official webpage
NAAA on Facebook

Nevis
Ath
National governing bodies for athletics